HNoMS Ørnen was a Royal Norwegian Navy corvette. 

Ørnen was commissioned 3 June 1833 and her first commander was capitaine Christian A. Bendz. The ship was used as a cadet-ship until she was refitted to serve as a lodging and guard ship in 1847. 

Ørnen was scrapped in 1874.

Sources
Norwegian Navy history page

Corvettes of the Royal Norwegian Navy
Training ships of the Royal Norwegian Navy
Ships built in Horten